The following is a timeline of the history of the city of Damascus, Syria.

Prior to 7th century

 965 BCE – Ezron, King of Aram-Zobah conquers Damascus
 843 BCE – Hazael assassinated Ben-Hadad I and made himself king of Damascus.
 732 BCE – Neo-Assyrian Empire conquers Damascus
 572 BCE – Neo-Babylonians conquered Damascus
 538 BCE – Achaemenid Empire annexes Damascus 
 333 BCE – Alexander the Great conquers Damascus 
 112 BCE – Damascus fell to Antiochus IX Cyzicenus.
 150 CE – Damascus became a Roman provincial city under Trajan.
 4th century – Temple of Jupiter built by the Romans.

7th–19th centuries
 613 – Sasanian captured Damascus during the Byzantine–Sasanian War of 602–628
 634 – Arab conquest of Damascus under Khalid ibn al-Walid.
 715 – Great Mosque built by Al-Walid I by converting the church of St John the Baptist constructed by Arcadius.
 789 – Qubbat al-Khazna built.
 1078 – Citadel of Damascus built.
 1126 – Crusaders attacked Damascus.
 1129 – Crusaders march on Damascus.
 1142 – Al-Mujahidiyah Madrasa established.
 1154 – Nur al-Din Bimaristan built.
 1196 – Mausoleum of Saladin built.
 1215 – Al-Adiliyah Madrasa founded.
 1216 – Citadel of Damascus rebuilt.
 1224 – Al-Rukniyah Madrasa built.
 1229 – Damascus besieged
 1234 – Aqsab Mosque built.
 1250 – Qaymariyya hand city over to al-Nasir Yusuf in bloodless coup.
 1254 – Al-Qilijiyah Madrasa established.
 1260 – Kitbuga, a confidant of the Mongol Ilkhan Hulagu, captured Damascus. Then, it was captured five days after the Battle of Ain Jalut by the Mamluk Sultanate.
 1277 – Al-Zahiriyah Library established.
 1400 – Timur, the Turco-Mongol conqueror, besieges Damascus.
 1515 – Al-Sibaiyah Madrasa built.
 1516 – Ottomans under Selim I conquered Damascus from the Mamluks.
 1518 – Salimiyya Takiyya built.
 1558 – Sulaymaniyya Takiyya built.
 1566 – Salimiyya Madrasa established.
 1574 – Khan al-Harir built.
 1605 – Printing press established.
 1736 – Khan Sulayman Pasha built.
 1750 – Azm Palace built.
 1752 – Khan As'ad Pasha built.
 1832 – Captured by Ibrahim Pasha of Egypt.
 1840 – Return of the city to Turkish domination, when the Egyptians were driven out of Syria.
 1860 – Massacre; the Moslem population rose against the Christians.
 1885 – Bakdash (ice cream parlor) established.
 1900 – Population: 154,000. (approx date)

20th century

 1918 – October: Arab troops led by Emir Feisal, and supported by British Armed Forces, capture Damascus, ending 400 years of Ottoman rule.
 1920 – July: French Armed Forces occupy Damascus, forcing Feisal to flee abroad.
 1923 – University founded.
 1925/6 – French forces bombard Damascus.
 1928 – Al-Wahda Club of Damascus founded.
 1935 – Population: 193,912.
 1939 – Chapel of Saint Paul inaugurated.
 1946 – Population: 303,952.
 1947 – Al-Jaish Sports Club founded.
 1960 – Syrian Television begins broadcasting.
 1961 – September: Discontent with Egyptian domination of the United Arab Republic prompts a group of Syrian Army officers to seize power in Damascus and dissolve the union.
 1964 – Population: 562,907 (estimate).
 1970 – Population: 836,668 city; 923,253 urban agglomeration.
 1977 – Higher Institute for Dramatic Arts founded.
 1981
 Bomb explodes near Syrian Air Force headquarters.
 Azbakiyah bombing
 1983 – Higher Institute for Applied Science and Technology founded.
 1984 – Al-Assad National Library established.
 1985 – Population: 1,196,710 (estimate).
 1986 – Bombings 
 1994 – Population: 1,549,000 (estimate).
 2000 – Spring

21st century

 2004 – Damascus Opera House inaugurated.
 2006
 February: "Danish and Norwegian embassies in Damascus are set on fire."
September: "Attack on the US embassy."
 2008 – Population: 1,680,000 (estimate).
 2009 – Damascus Securities Exchange founded.
 2011
 March: Protest; crackdown.
 Syrian civil war begins.
 2012
 January 2012 al-Midan bombing
 March 2012 Damascus bombings
 April 2012 Damascus bombings
 10 May 2012 Damascus bombings.
 Summer 2012 Damascus clashes
 Battle of Damascus (2012)
 2013
 Damascus offensive (2013)
 2018
 May: Syrian Armed Forces recapture the entire city of Damascus.

See also
 Timeline of Syrian history
 Timelines of other cities in Syria: Aleppo, Hama, Homs, Latakia

References

Bibliography

Published in 19th century
 
 
 
 
 
 
 
 
 
 . (+ 1898 ed.)

Published in 20th century
 
 
 
 
 R. Stephen Humphreys. "Urban Topography and Urban Society: Damascus under the Ayyubids and Mamluks." In his, Islamic History: A Framework for Inquiry. Minneapolis, 1988. pp. 209–32.
 Michael Chamberlain, Knowledge and Social Practice in Medieval Damascus, 1190–1350. Cambridge: Cambridge University Press, 1994. pp. 27–68.

Published in 21st century

External links

 
 

Damascus
Damascus
damascus

Years in Syria